The Great Excelsior Jazz Band was formed in Seattle in 1962. It was active in the Seattle area until 2003.  Original members included Ray Skjelbred piano, Bob Jackson (1943–2020) trumpet, Bob McCallister (1942–2012) trombone, Mike Duffy (1943–2019) bass, Rich Adams clarinet and Ed Alsman Drums.  They didn't want to be considered Trad or Dixieland. Bass player Mike Duffy felt the band approximated a type of jazz played by territory bands that crossed the country between the wars, roughly 1920 to 1940. He said "They had their own stlye, a kind of a rough charm." In a larger sense, their style was summed up by sax player Bob Wilbur who said “We didn't want to imitate their records. We wanted to play in their style but be creative at the same time.” The Great Excelisor Jazz Band's first gigs occurred during the Seattle Worlds Fair at the West Side Inn in West Seattle.   Their Motto was "No man stands so tall, as when he stoops to help a starving musician."

Gigs 
On June 5, 1962, there was a special night out for 300 graduates of Bellevue High School class of 1962. It began at the Olympic Hotel, where they were entertained by Carol Channing, the Brothers Four, and the Four Preps, next to the new Elks Club on Lake Union, where they danced the night away to the music of the Great Excelsior Jazz Band, who at the time had a nightly gig at the Westside Inn. In 1964 the Great Excelsior Jazz Band began two year long  run playing at the club Pete's Poop Deck in Pioneer Square.  On April 21, 1968, there was a "Media Mash at the Eagles Auditorium, featuring the Great Excelsior Jazz Band, along with several Seattle bands including The Magic Fern, Time Machine, Canterbury Tales, Tall Timber Boys, and Blues Feedback, playing from noon to midmight.  A light show was provided by Lux Sit & Dance and the Congglomerate Light Co.  The mash was to get publicity for an event a couple of days later.  That was the piano drop in Duvall, Washington.  Both events were benefits for the underground newspaper The Helix and the radio station KRAB FM.  The upright piano was dropped from a helicopter, after first appearing suspended by a steel cable. It was part of an all day happening.  Music was by Country Joe and the Fish.</ref> The Seattle PI, Darrell Bob Houston, Media Mash is the Message, April 19, 1968</ref> In 1968 they were hired to promote Richard A. C. Greene, candidate for Washington state land commissioner. They created musical radio spots, often using penny whistle, washboard and kazoo, and also appeared at events, including one at the Seattle Zoo (Warren G Harding Bandstand, behind the Ape House). In the news spot for that event, the columnist Emmett Watson refers to the candidate as "Richard AC-DC Greene." October 29, 1968  On May 2, 1969, The Great Excelsior Jazz Band played on the boat Sightseer, on a cruise from 8:00 to Midnight, on cruise on Lake Washington.  That cruise was so successful, they followed it with a Christmas Cruise on the steam ship Virgina V, on December 19, 1971.

In 1972 The Great Excelsior Jazz Band began a relationship with the Seattle Jazz Society.  On May 6, 1972, they played a jazz cruise on the Virginia V steamship, sponsored by the Jazz Society, that almost immediately sold out.  The relationship with the Seattle Jazz Society continued on for over for several years. It began with the band appearing each weekend at the Jazz Gallery, sponsored by the Jazz Society, at 3450 Eastlake East.  The building housing the Jazz Gallery had been built as a private residence in 1916, with a distinctive tower suggesting medieval days.  The building was remodeled into a store by Fred Anhalt in the Twenties. Since then it has housed a variety of different cafes.  The weekley gig ended in November 1973 when the Jazz Gallery lost its lease. The Jazz Society, which once had over a thousand members,  continued on at various locations for a couple of years, and then closed down in 1978.  In 1975 The Puget Sound Traditional Jazz Society was formed, and began a relationship with the Great Excelsior Jazz Band that continued for twenty years.  The Puget Sound Traditional Jazz Society and the Great Excelsior Band appeared in many venues the next several years, including The Blue Banjo,  The Bombay Bicycle Shop, The Russian Center, The University Tower Hotel, and others, before finally settling into the Mountaineers Club (300 3rd Ave W) for weekly events into the mid-1980s. In early 1978 The Great Excelsior Band began a one night each week gig at Skipper's Tavern (2307 Eastlake E) that lasted into mid 1980.  That was followed by a once a week gig at the Owl Tavern in Ballard. That gig lasted into 1989. The band appeared at the Port Townsend Jazz Festival February 24–26, 1984. They appeared  at the San Juan Island Dixieland Jazz Festival in Friday Harbor July 26–28, 1985.  In 1989 the band began a new once a week gig at the New Orleans Cafe in Pioneer Square.  The Great Excelsior Jazz Band became inactive in 1991.  They played a reunion gig, sponsored by the Puget Sound Traditional Jazz Society, on July 16, 1995, at the Mountaineer's Club. On November 9, 2003, the Great Excelsior Jazz Band played a reunion gig at the New Orleans Cafe.

Recordings 
 Claire Austin and the Great Excelsior Jazz Band, 1965 GBH records, LP<ref>Claire Austin and The Great Excelsior Jazz Band</retrieved December 5, 2021</ref>
 The Great Excelsior Jazz Band, Ray Skjelbred - Summer Session 1969, LP  ASP Records
 The Great Excelsior Jazz Band,  Hot Jazz From the Territories,  1976,  Voyager Records 
 The Great Excelsior Jazz Band, Roast Chestnuts, 1979, Voyager Records, LP
 The Great Excelsior Jazz Band: Remembering Joe 1981, Vogager Records, LP

Members
Over a fifty-year run, many players joined and left the Great Excelsior Jazz Band. After Ed Alsman left, Howard Gilbert played drums.  Joe Loughmiller was the drummer from 1967 to 1981.  In 1970 Ray Skjelbred moved to San Francisco, with Bob Gilman taking his place on piano. When Bob Jackson did his conscientious objector alternative service. Jim Goodwin filled in on trumpet.  Ken Wiley was the trombonist for several years.</ref> Hamilton Carson played sax beginning in the late seventies and was with them for ten years.  Pete Leinonen when Mike Duffy had conflicting gigs.  Skip McDaniel played bass, and appears on the LP  Great Excelsior Jazz Band Roast Chestnuts. Jake Powel played guitar.  Bob West sat in occasionally in the sixties.

References

American jazz ensembles from Washington (state)
Musical groups established in 1962
Musical groups from Seattle
1962 establishments in Washington (state)